Felicia Nossig  (1855–1939) was a Polish politician (Social Democrat), sociologist, journalist, feminist and translator.

She graduated as a teacher in 1873, and was active as a journalist from 1891, in several different publications. She was a secretary of the educational association in Lviv (1889), organized the first Women's Worker's Convention in Lviv (1892). She was a single mother and supported herself and her son on translations from Ukrainian and Russian into German from 1893. She was engaged in the Polish women's movement and often engaged as a speaker. In 1894, she studied to be a doctor in sociology in Switzerland.

References

 Aneta Górnicka-Boratyńska: Chcemy całego życia. Warszawa: Fundacja Res Publica, 1999, s. 128-147. .

1855 births
1939 deaths
Polish women's rights activists
19th-century Polish journalists
Polish women journalists
Polish sociologists
Polish women sociologists
Polish social democrats
Polish translators
Polish socialist feminists
19th-century Polish women writers
19th-century translators
Polish suffragists
20th-century Polish journalists
20th-century Polish women